Harriet Miller may refer to:
 Harriet Mann Miller (1831–1918), naturalist, ornithologist and children's writer
 Harriet Miller-Brown (born 1991), New Zealand alpine ski racer
 Harriet Miller (politician) (1919–2010), American chemist and mayor of Santa Barbara, California